Diapheromera velii, the prairie walkingstick, is a species of walkingstick in the family Diapheromeridae. It is found in North America.

Subspecies
These two subspecies belong to the species Diapheromera velii:
 Diapheromera velii eucnemis Hebard, 1937 i c g
 Diapheromera velii velii Walsh, 1864 i c g
Data sources: i = ITIS, c = Catalogue of Life, g = GBIF, b = Bugguide.net

References

External links

 

Phasmatodea
Articles created by Qbugbot
Insects described in 1864